Renato Zaccarelli (born 18 January 1951) is a former Italian professional footballer and manager who played as a midfielder.

Club career

After Giorgio Ferrini and Paolo Pulici, Zaccarelli is the third player with the most appearances for Torino in Serie A. He began his career in the youth ranks of Junior Ancona, a historical team in the doric district of Vallemiano; at age 15 he entered the Torino youth system, then was sold to gain experience in Serie B with Catania and Novara, up until his debut in Serie A with Verona in 1973. He returned to Turin in the summer of 1974; forming an exceptional midfield with Eraldo Pecci, Claudio Sala and Patrizio Sala the following season. He won the Scudetto with Torino in the 1975–76 season.

He retired at the end of the 1986–87 season with the Granata, having made 413 appearances and scored 21 goals in all competitions.

International career
Zaccarelli represented the Italy national football team for five years, making 25 appearances and scoring two goals. He participated at the 1978 FIFA World Cup in Argentina, where Italy finished fourth. He was played from bench as second to Giancarlo Antognoni, eventually making five appearances scoring one goal; that of a 2–1 comeback victory against France.

Style of play
Zaccarelli was a traditional advanced playmaker, who was elegant, practical and a consistent performer in midfield. Towards the end of his career he was moved back on the pitch and reinvented himself as a libero, almost as an additional midfielder. In this role he lived a second youth, to the point he was awarded the Guerin d'Oro in 1986 as the best footballer of the 1985–86 season.

Managerial career
After hanging up his boots, Zaccarelli alternated his managerial career with that of an executive. He was the director of football of Torino under the presidency of Roberto Goveani, then team manager under Gianmarco Calleri. In the 1992–93 season, he was named the director of football of Alessandria.

He began his managerial career in service of the Italy under-21 Serie B representative team, then was assistant coach of the Italy under-21. He returned to Torino in 2002 as head of the youth system, then as general manager in 2003, replacing Sandro Mazzola. He would later coach Torino during the 2002–03 season (succeeding Renzo Ulivieri) then in the 2004–05 Serie B season, taking over for Ezio Rossi prior to the promotion playoffs, won in the final against Perugia. The later would prove decisive for the fate of the club: while not being promoted to Serie A by virtue of the Covisoc decisions, Torino were subsequently allowed to stay in Serie B under the law Lodo Petrucci under the guidance of Urbano Cairo. In 2005–06 he moved to Bologna as the director of football.

Honours

Club
 Torino
 Coppa Italia: 1970–71
 Serie A: 1975–76

Individual
 Guerin d'oro: 1986

References

External links
 

1951 births
Living people
Italian footballers
Italy international footballers
Association football midfielders
Serie A players
Serie B players
Torino F.C. players
Hellas Verona F.C. players
Novara F.C. players
Catania S.S.D. players
1978 FIFA World Cup players
UEFA Euro 1980 players
Sportspeople from Ancona
Footballers from Marche